The Amputee Coalition is an American nonprofit organization based in Washington, D.C. The Amputee Coalition's mission is to reach out to and empower people affected by limb loss to achieve their full potential through education, support and advocacy, and to promote limb loss prevention.

Outreach programs
The Amputee Coalition runs multiple programs including the following:
National Limb Loss Resource Center
The National Limb Loss Resource Center provides comprehensive information and resources free of charge. All of the information provided is reviewed by the Coalition’s medical/scientific advisory committee of experts in the field of limb loss. The NLLRC offers a secure online form and toll-free number to get answers to questions related the limb loss and limb difference.

Support Groups and Peer Support

The Amputee Coalition recognizes the challenges of recovering from a traumatic event such as losing a limb or learning that your child will be born with limb loss. We have embraced peer support as one way to help address these challenges. With over 300 support groups and over 1,000 peer visitors across the country, peer support offers the emotional support, encouragement and information vital for a full recovery.

Publications
The Amputee Coalition of America's publications include inMotion magazine, published six times per year, and First Step: A Guide for Adapting to Limb Loss, published every other year and available in both English and Spanish. Another one-time publication is SideStep: A Guide to Preventing and Managing Diabetes.

References

External links

Charities based in Virginia
Community building
Amputee organizations
Disability organizations based in the United States